, née  (born 4 September 1975 in Kumagaya, Saitama) is a Japanese long-distance runner, who specializes in the 10,000 metres and the marathon race.

Achievements

Personal bests
5000 metres - 15:17.92 min (1999)
10,000 metres - 31:34.01 min (2004)
Half marathon - 1:09:59 hrs (2005)
Marathon - 2:24:25 hrs (2005)

External links

1975 births
Living people
Japanese female long-distance runners
Athletes (track and field) at the 1998 Asian Games
Athletes (track and field) at the 2000 Summer Olympics
Athletes (track and field) at the 2004 Summer Olympics
Olympic athletes of Japan
Sportspeople from Saitama Prefecture
Japanese female marathon runners
Asian Games competitors for Japan
20th-century Japanese women
21st-century Japanese women